Xingdong station is an underground Metro station of Shenzhen Metro Line 5. It started opened on 22 June 2011.

Station layout

Exits

References

External links
 Shenzhen Metro Xingdong Station (Chinese)
 Shenzhen Metro Xingdong Station (English)

Shenzhen Metro stations
Railway stations in Guangdong
Bao'an District
Railway stations in China opened in 2011